Rhytiphora lanosa is a species of beetle in the family Cerambycidae. It was described by Francis Polkinghorne Pascoe in 1869. It is known from Australia.

References

lanosa
Beetles described in 1869